Thomas Michael Bond  (13 January 1926 – 27 June 2017) was a British author. He is best known for a series of fictional stories for children, featuring the character of Paddington Bear. More than 35 million Paddington books have been sold around the world, and the characters have also appeared in a popular film series (featuring Paddington and Paddington 2 to date) and on television. His first book was published in 1958 and his last in 2017, a span of 59 years.

Early life
Thomas Michael Bond was born on 13 January 1926 in Newbury, Berkshire. He was raised in Reading, where his visits to Reading railway station to watch the Cornish Riviera Express pass through started a love of trains. His father was a manager for the post office. He was educated at Presentation College in Reading. His time there was unhappy. He told The Guardian in November 2014 that his parents had chosen the school "for the simple reason [that his] mother liked the colour of the blazers ... she didn't make many mistakes in life, but that was one of them". He left education aged 14, despite his parents' wishes for him to go to university. The Second World War was under way and he went to work in a solicitor's office for a year, and then as an engineer's assistant for the BBC.

On 10 February 1943 Bond survived an air raid in Reading. The building in which he was working collapsed under him, killing 41 people and injuring many more. Shortly afterwards he volunteered for aircrew service in the Royal Air Force as a 17-year-old, but he was discharged after being found to suffer from acute air sickness. He then served in the Middlesex Regiment of the British Army until 1947.

Author

Bond began writing in 1945, when he was stationed with the Army in Cairo, and sold his first short story to the magazine London Opinion. He was paid seven guineas and thought that he "wouldn't mind being a writer". After he had produced several plays and short stories, and had become a BBC television cameraman (he worked on Blue Peter for a time), his first book, A Bear Called Paddington, was published by Collins in 1958. Barbara Ker Wilson had read his draft at one sitting and she then phoned Bond at the number given. She was put through to Lime Grove Studios. Bond had to tell her that he was not supposed to take calls at work.

This was the start of Bond's series of books recounting the tales of Paddington Bear, a bear from "darkest Peru," whose Aunt Lucy sends him to England, carrying a jar of marmalade. In the first book the Brown family find the bear at Paddington Station, and adopt him, naming the bear after the station. By 1965 Bond was able to give up his BBC job to work full time as a writer.

Paddington's adventures have sold over 35 million books, have been published in nearly twenty countries, in over forty languages, and have inspired pop bands, race horses, plays, hot air balloons, movies and adaptations for television. Bond stated in December 2007 that he did not plan to continue the adventures of Paddington Bear in further volumes, but in April 2014 it was reported that a new book, entitled Love From Paddington, would be published that autumn. In Paddington, a 2014 film based on the books, Bond had a credited cameo as the Kindly Gentleman.

Bond also wrote another series of children's books, telling of the adventures of a guinea pig named Olga da Polga, who was named after the Bond family's pet, as well as the animated BBC television series The Herbs (1968). Bond also wrote culinary mystery stories for adults, featuring Monsieur Pamplemousse and his faithful bloodhound Pommes Frites.

Bond wrote Reflection on the Passing of the Years shortly after his 90th birthday. The piece was read by Sir David Attenborough, who also turned 90 in 2016, at the national service of thanksgiving to commemorate Queen Elizabeth II's 90th birthday at St Paul's Cathedral in June 2016. 

On 20 June 2016 StudioCanal acquired the Paddington franchise outright. Bond was allowed to keep the publishing rights to his series, which he licensed in April 2017 to HarperCollins for the next six years.

Television writing
Bond wrote two short films for the BBC: Simon's Good Deed, which was shown on 11 October 1955, and Napoleon's Day Out, shown on 9 April 1957. He also wrote one episode of the series The World Our Stage, an adaptation of the short story "The Decoration" by Guy de Maupassant, which aired on 4 January 1958.

His best known television work is as the creator and writer of the children's television series The Herbs and The Adventures of Parsley, again for the BBC.

Honours
Bond was appointed an Officer of the Order of the British Empire (OBE), for services to children's literature, in the 1997 Birthday Honours and Commander of the Order of the British Empire (CBE) in the 2015 Birthday Honours. On 6 July 2007 the University of Reading awarded him an Honorary Doctor of Letters.

On 10 January 2018 GWR named one of their Class 800 trains "Michael Bond / Paddington Bear".

Personal life and death

Bond was married twice: to Brenda Mary Johnson in 1950, from whom he separated in the 1970s; and to Susan Marfrey Rogers in 1981. He had two children. He lived in London, not far from Paddington Station, the place that inspired many of his books.

Bond died in London on 27 June 2017, at the age of 91. The cause of death has not been disclosed. The film Paddington 2 (2017) was dedicated to his memory. He is buried in Paddington Old Cemetery close to where he lived. The epitaph on his gravestone reads "Please look after this bear. Thank you."

In 2022, on the ITV programme DNA Journeys, it was discovered that Bond is a relative of the television presenter Kate Garraway.

Bibliography

Paddington Bear series
 1958 A Bear Called Paddington. London: Collins.
 1959 More About Paddington. London: Collins.
 1960 Paddington Helps Out. London: Collins.
 1961 Paddington Abroad. London: Collins.
 1962 Paddington at Large. London: Collins.
 1964 Paddington Marches On. London: Collins.
 1966 Paddington at Work. London: Collins.
 1968 Paddington Goes to Town. London: Collins.
 1970 Paddington Takes the Air. London: Collins. 
 1972 Paddington's Garden. London: Collins. 
 1973 Paddington's Blue Peter Story Book (sometimes titled as Paddington Takes to TV). London: Collins. 
 1974 Paddington on Top. London: Collins. 
 1975 Paddington at the Tower. London: Collins. 
 1979 Paddington Takes the Test. London: Collins. 
 1980 Paddington on Screen. London: Collins. 
 1984 Paddington at the Zoo. London: Collins. 
 1986 Paddington at the Palace. New York: Putnam. 
 1987 Paddington's Busy Day. London: Collins. 
 1992 A Day by the Sea 
 2001 Paddington in the Garden. London: Collins. 
 2003 Paddington and the Grand Tour. London: Collins. 
 2008 Paddington Rules the Waves. New York: HarperCollins. 
 2008 Paddington Here and Now. New York: HarperCollins. 
 2012 Paddington Races Ahead. New York: HarperCollins. 
 2012 Paddington Goes for Gold. New York: HarperCollins. 
 2014 Love From Paddington. New York: HarperCollins. 
 2017 Paddington's Finest Hour. New York: HarperCollins. 
 2018: Paddington at St Paul's. New York: HarperCollins.
 2018: Paddington Turns Detective and Other Funny Stories.

Olga da Polga series

Chapter books
 1971 The Tales of Olga da Polga. 
 1973 Olga Meets Her Match. 
 1976 Olga Carries On. 
 1982 Olga Takes Charge. 
 1987 The Complete Adventures of Olga Da Polga (omnibus). 
 1993 The Adventures of Olga Da Polga (omnibus). 
 2001 Olga Moves House. 
 2002 Olga Follows Her Nose. 
 2002 The Best of Olga Da Polga (omnibus).

Picture books
 1975 Olga Counts Her Blessings. 
 1975 Olga Makes a Friend. 
 1975 Olga Makes a Wish. 
 1975 Olga Makes Her Mark. 
 1975 Olga Takes a Bite. 
 1975 Olga's New Home. 
 1975 Olga's Second House. 
 1975 Olga's Special Day. 
 1983 The First Big Olga da Polga Book (omnibus). 
 1983 The Second Big Olga da Polga Book (omnibus).

Monsieur Pamplemousse series
 1983 Monsieur Pamplemousse. 
 1985 Monsieur Pamplemousse and the Secret Mission. 
 1986 Monsieur Pamplemousse on the Spot. 
 1987 Monsieur Pamplemousse Takes the Cure. 
 1989 Monsieur Pamplemousse Aloft. 
 1990 Monsieur Pamplemousse Investigates. 
 1991 Monsieur Pamplemousse Rests His Case. 
 1992 Monsieur Pamplemousse Stands Firm. 
 1992 Monsieur Pamplemousse on Location. 
 1993 Monsieur Pamplemousse Takes the Train. 
 1998 Monsieur Pamplemousse Omnibus Volume One. 
 1999 Monsieur Pamplemousse Omnibus Volume Two. 
 1999 Monsieur Pamplemousse Afloat. 
 1999 Monsieur Pamplemousse Omnibus Volume Three. 
 2000 Monsieur Pamplemousse on Probation. 
 2002 Monsieur Pamplemousse on Vacation. 
 2003 Monsieur Pamplemousse Hits the Headlines. 
 2006 Monsieur Pamplemousse and the Militant Midwives. 
 2007 Monsieur Pamplemousse and the French Solution. 
 2011 Monsieur Pamplemousse and the Carbon Footprint. 
 2015 Monsieur Pamplemousse and the Tangled Web.

Other books
 1966 Here Comes Thursday.
 1968 Thursday Rides Again.
 1969 Thursday Ahoy!
 1971 Thursday in Paris. 
 1971 Michael Bond's Book of Bears (editor). 
 1972 The Day the Animals Went on Strike. 
 1975 Windmill. 
 1975 How to Make Flying Things (nonfiction). 
 1975 Mr. Cram's Magic Bubbles (picture book). 
 1980 Picnic on the River. 
 1980 J. D. Polson and the Liberty Head Dime. 
 1981 J. D. Polson and the Dillogate Affair. 
 1983 The Caravan Puppets. 
 1986 Oliver the Greedy Elephant (picture book with Paul Parnes). 
 1987 The Pleasures of Paris (guidebook). 
 1988 A Mouse Called Thursday (omnibus). 
 1992 Something Nasty in the Kitchen (picture book). 
 1996 Bears and Forebears: A Life So Far (autobiography).

Television
 1955 Simon's Good Deed (short film)
 1957 Napoleon's Day Out (short film)
 1958 The World Our Stage (one episode, "The Decoration")
 1968 The Herbs (13 episodes)
 1970–71 The Adventures of Parsley (32 episodes)

References

External links

 Paddington Bear – The Official Website
 The Herbs
  Interview British Entertainment History Project

1926 births
2017 deaths
Military personnel from Berkshire
English children's writers
People from Newbury, Berkshire
People educated at Elvian School
Paddington Bear
writers from Reading, Berkshire
Royal Air Force personnel of World War II
Middlesex Regiment soldiers
Commanders of the Order of the British Empire
English autobiographers
English male novelists
20th-century English novelists
20th-century English male writers
21st-century English novelists
21st-century English male writers
Royal Air Force airmen
Burials at Paddington Old Cemetery